Bradley R. Hoover (born November 11, 1976) is a former American football fullback. He was signed by the Carolina Panthers as an undrafted free agent in 2000. He played college football at Western Carolina.

Early years
Hoover was a Shrine Bowl participant and an all-state selection at Ledford Senior High School in Thomasville, North Carolina. He led the state with 2,662 yards rushing and scored 34 touchdowns as a senior. He earned Davidson County, North Carolina and Central Carolina Conference Player of the Year honors.

College career
Hoover made a big impact at Western Carolina University being second all-time in school history in career yards.  Hoover exploded his junior season by setting a school rushing record with 1,663 yards, scoring 13 touchdowns in the process.  He earned first-team All-Southern Conference honors as a result.  His senior year, he followed up with 1,025 yards and 12 touchdowns, good enough for second-team All-SoCon.  He became only the second player in school history to post back-to-back 1,000 rushing yard seasons.  His 3,616 career yards are good enough for second all-time in school history, and his 28 touchdowns place him fifth on the list.  He is a member of the Sigma Chi Fraternity at Western and has contributed greatly to charitable causes in the Piedmont of North Carolina.

In 2008, Hoover was inducted by Western Carolina University into the school's Athletics Hall of Fame.

Professional career

Carolina Panthers
Hoover went undrafted in the 2000 NFL Draft; he was later signed as a free agent by the Carolina Panthers.  After a foot injury sidelined starting running back Tshimanga Biakabutuka, Hoover got two starts at tailback, including a Monday Night Football game against the Green Bay Packers where he became only the second rookie in team history to post a 100-yard game (Fred Lane was the first).  After switching to fullback for his second season, he became the full-time starter in 2002.  He caught two passes for touchdowns that season, the first touchdown receptions of his career.  During the Panthers run to Super Bowl XXXVIII, he was the primary blocker for Stephen Davis, allowing Davis to rush for a team record 1,444 yards.

2004 saw Hoover miss the first game of his career due to injury, as he sat out several games with an injured hip.  However, he still managed to contribute on offense, catching two touchdown passes and rushing for 246 yards.

On March 8, 2010, Hoover was released by the Panthers.

After football

In March 2013 Hoover was hired as the head football coach of Union Academy, a charter school in Monroe, North Carolina.
 In January 2014, Hoover was named the head football coach at Marvin Ridge High School, also in Union County. He also served as the head football coach at Cannon School, an independent school in Concord, North Carolina.

Career statistics

Regular season

Playoffs

External links
 Carolina Panthers bio

References

1976 births
Living people
People from Thomasville, North Carolina
Players of American football from North Carolina
American football fullbacks
Western Carolina Catamounts football players
Carolina Panthers players
Western Carolina University alumni